Cyrus Chestnut (born January 17, 1963) is an American jazz pianist, composer and producer. In 2006, Josh Tyrangiel, music critic for Time, wrote: "What makes Chestnut the best jazz pianist of his generation is a willingness to abandon notes and play space."

Early life
Cyrus Chestnut was born in Baltimore, Maryland, in 1963, the son of McDonald (a retired post-office employee and church pianist) and Flossie (a city social services worker and church choir director). Chestnut began learning the piano at the age of seven, and in his boyhood played at Mount Calvary Baptist Church.  By the age of nine, he was studying classical music at the Peabody Institute. In 1985, Chestnut earned a degree in jazz composition and arranging from Boston's Berklee College of Music.

Jazz career
In the late 1980s and early 1990s, Chestnut worked with Wynton Marsalis, Terence Blanchard, Donald Harrison, and other bandleaders. He joined the band of jazz vocalist Betty Carter in the early 1990s and appeared on her  1992 album It's Not About the Melody. That same year, he recorded his first albums as a bandleader, The Nutman Speaks and Nut. Chesnut has continued to work and record as a bandleader into the 21st century.

In 2006, Telarc released Genuine Chestnut, his first album for the label. On it he is accompanied by his regular trio of Michael Hawkins, bass and Neal Smith, drums. Additional artists on this session include Russell Malone, guitar and Steven Kroon, percussion. It includes jazz interpretations of some well-known pop numbers of the past half-century, including "If", the early 1970s soft-rock ballad by Bread. "This song has been with me ever since the sixth grade," Chestnut recalled, "I had to play it for my English teacher's wedding. I've played it in many and various contexts. I actually played it in a Top 40 band when I was just out of school. A lot of time has passed, but then recently I just started thinking about it again." Chestnut's own "Mason–Dixon Line" is one of the album's high points, a joyful bebop number.

Discography

As leader

As sideman
With Gerald Albright
 Giving Myself to You (Atlantic, 1995)

With Carl Allen
 Testimonial (Atlantic, 1995)

With Carl Allen & Rodney Whitaker
 Get Ready (Mack Avenue, 2009)

With Tiffany Austin
 Unbroken (Con Alma, 2018)

With Gary Bartz
 The Blues Chronicles: Tales of Life (Atlantic, 1996)

With Kathleen Battle
 So Many Stars (Sony, 1995)

With Alexander Berenson
 Take Me With You (Butman Music, 2010)

With Dee Dee Bridgewater
 Prelude to a Kiss: The Duke Ellington Album (Phillips, 1996)

With Jeri Brown
 Fresh Start (Justin Time, 1996)

With Ronnie Burrage
 Shuttle (Sound Hills, 1993)

With Ann Hampton Callaway
 To Ella with Love (Sin-Drome Records, 1996)

With Betty Carter
 It's Not About the Melody (Verve, 1992)

With James Carter
 In Carterian Fashion (Atlantic, 1998)
 Gold Sounds (Brown Brothers, 2005)

With Michael Carvin
 Between Me and You (Muse, 1989)
 Revelation (Muse, 1991)

With Freddy Cole
 Always (Fantasy, 1995)
 A Circle of Love (Fantasy, 1996)
 To The Ends of the Earth (Fantasy, 1997)
 Le Grand Freddy (Fantasy, 1999)

With Carla Cook
 It's All About Love (MaxJazz, 1999)
 Dem Bones (MaxJazz, 2001)
 Simply Natural (MaxJazz, 2002)

With Elvis Costello and the Brodsky Quartet
 The Juliet Letters (Warner Bros., 1993)

With Dee Daniels
 State of the Art (Criss Cross, 2013)
 Intimate Conversations (Origin, 2014)

With Michael Dease
 Grace (Jazz Legacy, 2010)

With Dr. John and the Donald Harrison Band
 Funky New Orleans (Metro, 2000)

With Cynthia Felton
 Afro Blue: The Music of Oscar Brown Jr. (CD Baby, 2012)
 Freedom Jazz Dance (CD Baby, 2012)
 Save Your Love For Me (CD Baby, 2014)

With The Dizzy Gillespie All-Star Big Band
 I'm BeBoppin' Too (Half Note, 2009)

With Jimmy Greene
 Beautiful Life (Mack Avenue, 2014)

With Mark Gross
 Blackside (Jazz Legacy, 2012)

With  Roy Hargrove
 With the Tenors of Our Time (Verve, 1994)

With Donald Harrison
 Full Circle (Sweet Basil, 1990)
 For Art's Sake (Candid, 1991)
 Indian Blues (Candid, 1995)
 Big Chief (Past Perfect, 2002)

With Vincent Herring
 Folklore: Live at the Village Vanguard (MusicMasters, 1994)
 Don't Let It Go (MusicMasters, 1995)
 Days of Wine and Roses (MusicMasters, 1996)
 The Uptown Shuffle (Smoke Session, 2014)
 Hard Times (Smoke Sessions, 2017)

With Laird Jackson
 Quiet Flame (Venus, 2016)

With Denise Jannah
 I Was Born In Love With You (Blue Note, 1995)
 A Heart Full of Music (Timeless, 2000)

With George Kawaguchi
 Between Me and You (Muse, 1989)
 Revelation (Muse, 1991)
 Plays Herbie Hancock (King Japan, 2004)

With The Keystone Quartet
 A Love Story (32 Jazz, 2000)

With Kevin Mahogany
 Another Time Another Place (Warner Bros., 1997)

With Wynton Marsalis
 The Marciac Suite (Columbia, 1999)
 Higher Ground (Blue Note, 2005)

With Christian McBride
 Gettin' to It (Verve, 1995)

With Bette Midler
 Bathhouse Betty (Warner Bros., 1998)

With Charnett Moffett
 Music from Our Soul (Motéma Music, 2017)

With George Mraz
 Bottom Lines (Milestone, 1997)
 Duke's Place (Milestone, 1999)

With Roy Nathanson
 Fire at Keaton's Bar & Grill (Six Degrees, 2000)

With Marilyn Scott
 Every Time We Say Goodbye (Venus, 2008)

'With Chiara Pancaldi
 I walk a Little Faster (Challenge Records, 2015)

With Madeleine Peyroux
 Dreamland (Atlantic, 1996)

With Morris Robinson
 Going Home (Decca, 2007)

With Jackie Ryan
 Doozy (Open Arts, 2008)

With Ameen Saleem
 The Groove Lab (Jando Music, 2013)

With Andy Scott
 Angels (Jazz Legacy, 2015)

With Jimmy Scott
 Mood Indigo (Milestone, 2000)
 Moon Glow (Milestone, 2003)

With Marilyn Scott
 Every Time We Say Goodbye (Venus, 2008)

With Bud Shank
 By Request: Bud Shank Meets the Rhythm Section (Milestone, 1997)

With Jae Sinnett
 Blue Jae (Valley Vue, 1992)
 House and Sinnett (Positive Music, 1994)
 Listen (Heart Music, 1997)

With Billy Taylor
 Taylor Made at the Kennedy Center (Kennedy Center, 2005)

With Joris Teepe and The Don Braden Quintet
 Pay As You Earn (Mons, 1995)

With Tim Warfield
 Cool Blue (Criss Cross, 1995)
 A Whisper in the Midnight (Criss Cross, 1996)
 Gentle Warrior (Criss Cross, 1998)
 Jazz Is (Criss Cross, 2002)
 Eye of the Beholder (Criss Cross, 2013)

With Sadao Watanabe
 Remembrance (Verve, 1999)

With Kim Waters
 Tribute (Warlock, 1992)

With Rodney Whitaker
 Children of the Light (Koch, 1996)

With Phil Wilson's Rainbow Band
 Latin American Tour (Shiah, 1985)

With Steve Wilson
 Step Lively (Criss Cross, 1995)

With Joh Yamada
 Bluestone (Milestone, 1999)

With Dave Young
 Two by Two, Volume Two (Justin Time, 1996)
 Side by Side (Justin Time, 1996)

Compilations

References

External links
Cyrus Chestnut official website
Hip online interview
Jazz Police review
Interview with and performance by Cyrus Chestnut at NPR.org
Cyrus Chestnut, pianist, bandleader

1963 births
Living people
American jazz pianists
American male pianists
African-American pianists
Musicians from Baltimore
People from Harford County, Maryland
Atlantic Records artists
Berklee College of Music alumni
20th-century American pianists
Baptists from Maryland
Jazz musicians from Maryland
21st-century American pianists
20th-century American male musicians
21st-century American male musicians
American male jazz musicians
WJ3 Records artists
HighNote Records artists
Smoke Sessions Records artists
20th-century African-American musicians
21st-century African-American musicians